The following is history of the Red Terror in Ethiopia, a political repression launched by the military junta Derg from 1976 to 1978, which resulted more than 10,000 deaths.

Terminology
The name "Red Terror" was officially used by the government,  which was used as a threat to population and eliminate dissent. The exact casualties of the Red Terror are unknown, but certainly in excess of 10,000 people.

Urban opposition
In the 1960s and early 1970s, the Haile Selassie government was heavily criticized by numerous people of classes: the educated, particularly university students were among of the protestors that were espoused by left-wing philosophy and deeply resented toward accommodations of students provisions, i.e studying conditions, the lack of student union and student publications, and the shortage of career opportunities for them following graduation. This led hostile method to overthrow the government.

Students' songs praised Ho Chi Minh and Che Guevara, and a popular slogan was "Through Bale not Bole", referring to an expectation of revolution through rural insurgency (as in Bale) and not through returning exiles (who arrive in Addis Ababa through Bole International Airport). Soon after, the opposition altered to radical elements and the formation of the Ethiopian People's Revolutionary Party (EPRP) and All-Ethiopia Socialist Movement (known by Amharic acronym as MEISON). Those groups had tactical difference over the status of Eritrea, but their political goal was relatively brand of Marxism. By 1976, the big difference that MEISON supported the military government to achieve communism whereas EPRDF was not.

In mid-1976, as response to government crackdown to student members opposition, the EPRP began to assassinate senior Derg members and its client institution and was suspected for attempting coup d'état against the government in July 1976. 21 coup plotters were executed and the arrest of EPRP began in August. On 23 September, the first of nine plotters was listed on attempted assassination of Mengistu Haile Mariam. On 2 October, the EPRP assassinated Fikre Merid, a leading MEISON and government cadre. In the next two months, ten senior government officials and 15 members of the secret service were killed and the public assassination continued through 1977.

First wave
The killing of people suspected to EPRP began in September 1976 where 21 people were executed on 21 October and the deaths of further 17 were announced on 18 November. It was until the execution of General Tafari Benti by Mengistu in February 1977, culminating in the official declaration of the Red Terror and mass killings began then. Mengistu labelled the EPRP's sporadic campaign of the assassination the "White Terror" and Lt Col Atnafu Abate promised "for every revolutionary killed, a thousand counter-revolutionaries executed". The promise was not genuine commitment in this manner after Atnafu organized "Defense of the Revolution Squads", distributing arms to Addis Ababa kebele members who were considered to be loyal. On 17 April 1977, Mengistu delivered speech at Meskel Square that threatened the people against "enemies of the revolution " and smashed three bottles filled with blood-like liquid to signify the impending destruction of imperialism, feudalism and bureaucratic capitalism.

On 26 February, 44 prisoners were taken outside Addis Ababa and executed. On 2 March 1977, several people were executed by the government for distributing EPRP literature during a pro-government demonstration. May Day became popular revolutionary movement that supports EPRP planned to stage large rallies. At the night of 29 April, the Defense Squads arrived the capital and together with local kebele officials, began massacre suspected EPRP supporters.

On 7–8 May, daytime curfew was ordered and house-to-house searches were conducted where thousands being detained by Defense Squads and soldiers. On 17 May, the Secretary-General of Swedish Save the Children Fund stated that "one thousand children have been massacred in Addis Ababa and their bodies, lying in the streets, are ravaged by roving hyenas." He also estimated that 100-500 young people —some of young as 12—were killed every night. On 4–5 June, about 400 students wer killed. Totally, 2,500 were killed in the first phase of the terror.

Second and third waves
Initially, EPRF penetrated through Addis Ababa by the first phase, but retreated to rural base in Tigray. Haile Fida, the leader of MEISON and confidante and ideologue of Mengistu, was detained in August 1977. After spending several months in prison, he disappeared whilst many MEISON cadres were arrested shortly afterwards.

In October, the second phase of the terror started which estimated around 3,000–4,000 people deaths. The cause of massacre largely fell to civil war between MEISON and the remnants of the EPRP. By the end of 1977, MEISON members had been thoroughly purged from the ranks of government and the higher offices of the kebeles. However many remained at the lower level, especially in the provinces.

The third wave took place in December 1977 and February 1978 where 300 people were killed on the night of 16 December. On 21 December, Defense Squads attacked a mosque with machine gun. By the end of the year, Amnesty International estimated that 30,000 political prisoners were held in central prisons and detention centers of the 291 kebeles of Addis Ababa. Perhaps 5,000 were killed in Addis Ababa in these months, and more in provincial towns. By March 1978, detention and massacre had been persisted by the year.

Campaign against the merchants
Traders and shopkeepers significantly were victims of the massacre. By 1975, the grain traders were targeted by the Derg while campaign against merchants—like other landlord counterparts—were not part of the Red Terror.

As the political radical leaning of the Derg become clearer, merchants were blamed for causing famines of 1972–74 and seen as class enemies of the revolution. Many large merchants tended to join conservative parties like the Ethiopian Democratic Union (EDU), which was militarily active in Tigray and Gondar. 

In 1973, 90% of all marketed grain was sold through an estimated 20,000–30,000 grain merchants. A small minority of 25 dominated the supply to Addis Ababa, owing a storage capacity of 100,000 tonnes between them. The latter group was  certainly able to overcome shortages in the city, though in 1973 their chief contribution to famine was facilitated by exporting grain from famine-stricken Wollo to more prosperous Addis Ababa, where food prices increased by 20% during the scarcity. The Special Penal Code of November 1974 also prohibited economic actions in the country, which constituted as an attack to the state itself. Article 27 drafted with vague manner and the Special Court Martial did the same in draconian way, which completely prohibition any economic activities that deemed "illegal".

In provinces
While most detentions and execution were fell mostly in Addis Ababa, there were also several incidents of massacre throughout the country, especially in 1978. Most cities such as Asmara, Gondar, Bahir Dar and Jimma endured severely.

References

Ethiopian Civil War
History of Ethiopia